Giorgio Da Rin (born October 10, 1988 in Pieve di Cadore, Italy) is an Italian curler.

Teams

References

External links

Search Results for: Giorgio Da Rin - FISG - Federazione Italiana Sport del Ghiaccio

Living people
1988 births
Sportspeople from the Province of Belluno
Italian male curlers